The BSA Lightning Rocket was a Birmingham Small Arms Company (BSA) motorcycle made in Birmingham. A highly-tuned version of the BSA A65R Rocket, it was BSA's bid to capture the potentially lucrative USA export market in the mid-1960s. Twin Amal 389/206 carburetors and high-compression pistons, combined with an optional close-ratio gearbox, gave lively acceleration.

Sharing many A65 cycle parts, the Lightning Rocket had a slimmer fuel tank and mudguards, with additional chrome. From 1965, the A65 was discontinued in the UK and the BSA A65L Lightning became the main BSA production twin.

See also
 BSA Royal Star
 BSA Spitfire

References

Lighting Rocket
Standard motorcycles
Motorcycles introduced in 1964